The 2020–21 Washington Huskies men's basketball team represented the University of Washington in the 2020–21 NCAA Division I men's basketball season. The Huskies, led by fourth-year head coach Mike Hopkins, play their home games at Alaska Airlines Arena at Hec Edmundson Pavilion in Seattle, Washington as members of the Pac-12 Conference.

Previous season
The Huskies finished the 2019–20 season 15–17, 5–13 in Pac-12 play to finish in twelfth place. Isaiah Stewart was named to the All Pac-12 first team and All-Freshman team. The Huskies as the 12th seed lost to Arizona in a first round game of the Pac-12 tournament. The rest of the Pac-12 tournament and all post season tournaments were canceled due to the COVID-19 pandemic.

Off-season

Departures

Incoming transfers

2021 recruiting class

Roster

Depth chart

Schedule and results

|-
!colspan=12 style=|Regular season

|-
!colspan=12 style=| Pac-12 Tournament

|-

Washington was scheduled to play Tulane in the Pac-12 2020 China game on November 14 however this game was canceled due to the COVID-19 pandemic. A game against Oklahoma in the Pac-12 Coast-to-Coast Challenge and a game against Auburn were also canceled.

Rankings

*AP does not release post-NCAA Tournament rankings.^Coaches did not release a Week 2 poll.

Awards and honors

All Pac-12 Team

Quade Green honorable mention

Pac-12 Player of the Week
Jamal Bey—week 8 Colorado, Utah

References

Washington Huskies men's basketball seasons
Washington
Washington Huskies basketball, men
Washington Huskies basketball, men